Stephan Niklaus (born 17 April 1958) is a retired male decathlete from Switzerland. A member of the Leichtathletikclub Basel he set his personal best (8337 points) on 3 July 1983 at a meet in Lausanne, which still stands at the Swiss national record. Niklaus won three national titles in the men's decathlon during his career: 1981, 1982 and 1983.

Achievements

References
sports-reference
trackfield.brinkster

1958 births
Living people
Swiss decathletes
Athletes (track and field) at the 1980 Summer Olympics
Olympic athletes of Switzerland